Mikael "Mål-Micke" Andersson (born August 21, 1978) is a Swedish former footballer who played as a midfielder.

He started to play football in Husie IF. His senior career started in Malmö FF, then seven years in Hammarby IF. He played two years in Norway with Sandefjord Fotball. 2008 he returned to Sweden and Enköpings SK. After one season in Enköpings SK he retired from football.

Honours
Hammarby IF
Allsvenskan: 2001

References

External links 
 
 

1978 births
Living people
Swedish footballers
Allsvenskan players
Malmö FF players
Hammarby Fotboll players
Sandefjord Fotball players
Enköpings SK players
Footballers from Malmö
Expatriate footballers in Norway
Swedish expatriate footballers
Swedish expatriate sportspeople in Norway
Association football midfielders